The   otherwise known as the "Circle Two" Plan was the second of four expansion plans of the Imperial Japanese Navy between 1930 and the start of World War II.

Background
The London Naval Treaty placed severe restrictions on Japan's naval capabilities vis-a-vis the United States Navy and the British Royal Navy in terms of tonnage and numbers of capital warships. The response of the Imperial Japanese Navy General Staff was to initiate a construction program to build new warships to the allotted tonnage limits in each of the restricted categories, and to invest in types of warships and weaponry not specifically covered by the provisions of the treaty.

The "Circle One" plan was submitted by the Naval Ministry and approved by the Cabinet in November 1930, and officially ratified by the Diet of Japan in 1931. It called for the construction of 39 new combat vessels, centering on four of the new s, and expansion of the Imperial Japanese Navy Air Service to 14 Naval Air Groups. However, plans for a second expansion budget were delayed by the Tomozuru Incident and IJN 4th Fleet Incident, when it was revealed that the basic designs of many Japanese warships were flawed due to poor construction techniques and instability caused by attempting to mount too much weaponry on too small a displacement hull. As a result, most of the naval budget in 1932–1933 was absorbed in modifications to rectify issues with existing equipment.

In 1934, the Naval Ministry submitted its second expansion plan to the Cabinet and Diet for approval. This plan was a multiyear (four year) budget, covering the construction of 48 new warships and creation of eight new Naval Air Groups. A total of 431,680,800 Yen was allotted for warship construction and 33,000,000 Yen for naval aviation.

Table of vessels

See also
 1st Naval Armaments Supplement Programme (Maru 1 Keikaku, 1931)
 3rd Naval Armaments Supplement Programme (Maru 3 Keikaku, 1937)
 4th Naval Armaments Supplement Programme (Maru 4 Keikaku, 1939)
 Temporal Naval Armaments Supplement Programme (Maru Rin Keikaku, 1940)
 Rapidly Naval Armaments Supplement Programme (Maru Kyū Keikaku, 1941)
 Additional Naval Armaments Supplement Programme (Maru Tui Keikaku, 1941)
 5th Naval Armaments Supplement Programme (Maru 5 Keikaku, 1941)
 6th Naval Armaments Supplement Programme (Maru 6 Keikaku, 1942)
 Modified 5th Naval Armaments Supplement Programme (Kai-Maru 5 Keikaku, 1942)
 Wartime Naval Armaments Supplement Programme (Maru Sen Keikaku, 1944)

Notes

References

Naval Armaments Supplement Programme
Naval Armaments Supplement Programme